The Evelyn Gill Walker House is a historic house at 18 South Spruce Street in Paris, Arkansas.  Built by mason Tolbert E. Gill over a several-year period beginning in 1938, it is a distinctive example of Gill's Rustic style, with a stone veneer exterior and decorative components.  It has a -story gabled main section, with a flat-roof porch in front, and a flat-roof ell in the rear. The ell features a turret with a bell-cast top, with a surrounding curved staircase leading to an open deck on the ell's roof.

The house was listed on the National Register of Historic Places in 1993.

See also
National Register of Historic Places listings in Logan County, Arkansas

References

Houses on the National Register of Historic Places in Arkansas
National Register of Historic Places in Logan County, Arkansas
Houses in Logan County, Arkansas
Buildings and structures in Paris, Arkansas